Phostria quadriguttata is a moth in the family Crambidae. It was described by Francis Walker in 1869. It is found in the Democratic Republic of the Congo and Sierra Leone.

References

Phostria
Moths described in 1869
Moths of Africa